When's Your Birthday? is a 1937 American romantic comedy film directed by Harry Beaumont and starring Joe E. Brown. While original prints of this film had a cartoon sequence in Technicolor directed by Bob Clampett and Leon Schlesinger, most surviving prints (including the Internet Archive) have the sequence in black-and-white.

Premise
Dustin Willoughby (Joe E. Brown) is a prizefighter and believer in astrology who only wins when the stars are in alignment.

Cast
Joe E. Brown - Dustin Willoughby
Marian Marsh - Jerry Grant
Fred Keating - Larry Burke
Edgar Kennedy - Mr. Henry Basscombe
Maude Eburne - Mrs. Fanny Basscombe
Suzanne Kaaren - Diane Basscombe
Margaret Hamilton - Mossy - the Maid
Minor Watson - James J. Regan
Frank Jenks - Lefty - Regan's Henchman
Don Rowan - Steve - Regan's Henchman
Granville Bates - Judge O'Day
Charles Judels - Acropolis, the Headwaiter
Corky - Zodiac, the Dog
Bobby Barber	- Waiter Who Drops Flower Pot (uncredited)
Ward Bond   - Police Detective (uncredited)
Kit Guard	- Ringside Cornerman (uncredited)
Tom Kennedy -  Fight Manager (uncredited)
Bull Montana - (The) Salvador Slayer (uncredited)

Soundtrack
"Toreador Song" from Carmen by Georges Bizet
William Tell Overture by Gioachino Rossini
Happy Birthday to You by Mildred J. Hill and Patty Hill
Ruth Robin with Manny Harmon and His Orchestra – I Love You from Coast to Coast, music and lyrics by Albert Stillman, Alex Hyde and Basil Adlam
Sobre las Olas (Over the Waves) by Juventino Rosas
Stars and Stripes Forever by John Philip Sousa
When the Moon Comes over the Mountain, music and lyrics by Kate Smith, Howard Johnson and Harry M. Woods

External links

1937 films
1937 romantic comedy films
1930s sports comedy films
American boxing films
American films with live action and animation
American romantic comedy films
1930s English-language films
1930s Spanish-language films
American black-and-white films
Films directed by Harry Beaumont
Films produced by David L. Loew
1937 multilingual films
American multilingual films
Spanish-language American films
1930s American films
Films about astrology